Geof is a male given name. Notable people with this name include:

 Geof Courtenay (1921–1980), English cricket player
 Geof Darrow (born 1955), American comic book artist
 Geof Gleeson (1927–1994), British judoka
 Geof Isherwood (born 1960), American illustrator
 Geof Kotila, American basketball coach
 Geof Manthorne, American chef
 Geof Motley (born 1935), Australian rules football player and coach

See also
 Geoff (disambiguation)
 Grupo Especial de Operaciones Federales, Argentina